The 2017 European Darts Matchplay was the sixth of twelve PDC European Tour events on the 2017 PDC Pro Tour. The tournament took place at the Edel-optics.de Arena, Hamburg, Germany between 9–11 June 2017. It featured a field of 48 players and £135,000 in prize money, with £25,000 going to the winner.

James Wade was the defending champion after defeating Dave Chisnall 6–5 in the final of the 2016 tournament, but lost to Kyle Anderson in the second round.

Michael van Gerwen won his 16th European Tour Title after defeating Mensur Suljović 6–3 in the final.

Prize money
This is how the prize money is divided:

Qualification and format

The top 16 players from the PDC ProTour Order of Merit on 11 May automatically qualified for the event and were seeded in the second round.

The remaining 32 places went to players from five qualifying events - 18 from the UK Qualifier (held in Milton Keynes on 19 May), eight from the West/South European Qualifier (held on 31 May), four from the Host Nation Qualifier (held on 8 June), one from the Nordic & Baltic Qualifier (held on 18 March) and one from the East European Qualifier (held on 30 April).

The following players took part in the tournament:

Top 16
  Michael van Gerwen (champion)
  Peter Wright (third round)
  Mensur Suljović (runner-up)
  Simon Whitlock (second round)
  Benito van de Pas  (second round)
  Dave Chisnall (quarter-finals)
  Jelle Klaasen (second round)
  Kim Huybrechts (second round)
  Alan Norris (third round)
  James Wade (second round)
  Ian White (third round)
  Joe Cullen (quarter-finals)
  Michael Smith (semi-finals)
  Daryl Gurney (third round)
  Cristo Reyes (semi-finals)
  Mervyn King (third round)

UK Qualifier 
  Stephen Bunting (quarter-finals)
  Lee Bryant  (first round)
  Adrian Lewis  (first round)
  Peter Hudson (quarter-finals)
  Kyle Anderson (third round)
  Andy Hamilton (third round)
  James Wilson (second round)
  Richard North (second round)
  Chris Dobey  (first round)
  Darren Webster  (first round)
  Andy Jenkins  (first round)
  Justin Pipe (second round)
  Nathan Aspinall (second round)
  Mickey Mansell (first round)
  John Henderson  (second round)
  Peter Jacques (second round)
  Brendan Dolan (first round)
  Chris Quantock  (first round)

West/South European Qualifier
  John Michael (second round)
  Kenny Neyens  (first round)
  Mike De Decker (second round)
  Jimmy Hendriks (second round)
  Vincent van der Voort (third round)
  Christian Kist  (first round)
  Antonio Alcinas  (first round)
  Dirk van Duijvenbode (second round)

Host Nation Qualifier
  Erik Tautfest (first round)
  Martin Schindler (first round)
  Max Hopp (first round)
  Mike Holz (first round)

Nordic & Baltic Qualifier
  Marko Kantele (second round)

East European Qualifier
  Krzysztof Ratajski (first round)

Draw

References

2017 PDC European Tour
2017 in German sport